Chin Christian Institute of Theology, also known as CCIT, is situated in Falam, Chin State, Myanmar. It is a school run by Chin Baptist Convention, which belongs to Myanmar Baptist Convention.

History

Missionary Chester Strait started a Bible school in Hakha in 1928. During the World War II, the school was closed. To meet the need of the growing churches in the Chin Hills, Bible Schools were opened again in Hakha by the Johnsons, 1948, and in Tedim by the Nelsons, 1947. The said missionaries went home on furlough in 1952.

A Bible School was started again in Tedim in 1953; S T Hau Go was the principal there. Though it was not yet official, S T Hau Go gave the name Zomi Baptist Convention Bible School. The school needed to be moved to Hakha in 1954; R G Johnson was the principal there. The first graduation service was held there in 1956. Johnson printed the name Chin Hills Bible School on the first graduation certificate. The Zomi Baptist Convention Executive Committee officially gave the name Zomi Baptist Bible School in December 1956. The Schools both in Tedim and in Hakha were conducted on middle school level.

Baptist Mission Secretary, E E Sowards, was much concerned for the upgrading of the school into a high school level. And the school was moved from Hakha to Falam, the District Headquarters, in 1959.

Those years testified the fact that theological education work was mobile, shared for management through qualified leaders, regardless of geographical distance.

Principal David Van Bik proposed to change the name to Zomi Baptist Theological School, and it was adopted, 1960. The school was renamed Zomi Baptist Theological Seminary as proposed by Principal Simon Pau Khan En, in 1974. The year saw offering of the Diploma Course. The name Zomi Theological College was proposed by principal Chum Awi and adopted in 1983. The year started the B Th degree program. The college was affiliated to the Burma now Myanmar Institute of Theology, Insein, from 1983 to 1991. Thus the B Th degree was conferred by the BIT for three times: 1988, 1990, 1991.

The college was accepted as a member institute of the Association for Theological Education in South East Asia, ATESEA, in 1982. Every four-year visit of the ATESEA Accreditation Commission has made good report upon our degree programs and even our projects. The ZTC BTh was accredited by the ATESEA in 1991.Upon the proposal of the principal Rev. Dr. Law Ha Ling, with the approval of Officers Council and executive committee of Zomi Baptist Convention respectively, the school was renamed Chin Christian Institute of Theology in March 2013 at the 21st General Meeting of ZBC.

Since opened, the CCIT has produced Christian ministers and community leaders for 851 in number: certificate and diploma 243; B Th 445; BRE 100; B.Min. 26; MMiss 20; M.Div. 34. The CCIT have had a Th.B. joint-program with four sister schools: Chin Christian College in Hakha, Tedim Theological College, Tedim, and Bethel Theological Seminary, Tahan, Union Theological Seminary, UTC, Matupi. Those ones were already accredited by the ATESEA in 2000, 2004.

Programs

At present, CCIT offers the following programs of study:

 Master of Divinity (a three-year master program)
 Master of Ministry (a two-year master program)
 Bachelor of Theology (a four-year bachelor program)
 Bachelor of Ministry (a two-year bachelor program)
 Bachelor in Religious Education (a two-year bachelor program)

References 

Universities and colleges in Myanmar
Seminaries and theological colleges in Myanmar
Christian colleges in Myanmar